David R. Goldfield is an American historian, writer, film director, and professor. He is a long-time supporter of the Democratic Party. He is the author of sixteen books, including Black, White, and Southern: Race Relations and Southern Culture and Cotton Fields and Skyscrapers. Both of these books were nominated for the Pulitzer Prize. Currently, he is the Robert Lee Bailey Professor of History at the University of North Carolina in Charlotte.

Education
Goldfield is originally from Memphis, Tennessee, but grew up in Brooklyn, New York. He attended the University of Maryland, and earned his PhD in 1970.

Career
Goldfield has held his current position as Robert Lee Bailey Professor of History since 1982. His research interests mainly focus on the American South, Urban History, and the American Civil War. He is the editor of the Journal of Urban History.

Goldfield has served as an expert witness in voting rights cases and consulted for history museums. He also works as an Academic Specialist for the US State Department, which means he leads workshops and seminars that focus on American political culture and help to provide historical context for present-day elections.

He is the author or editor of sixteen books. Two of his books, Black, White, and Southern: Race Relations and Southern Culture and Cotton Fields and Skyscrapers, won the Mayflower Award for nonfiction and were nominated for the Pulitzer Prize. The former book was also awarded the Outstanding Book Award from the Gustavus Myers Center for the Study of Human Rights. Currently, he is working on a book titled, The Gifted Generation: America in the Post War Era.

Publications
The American Journey Combined Volume (7th Edition), co-author, 2013, 
America Aflame: How the Civil War Created a Nation, 2011,  
The Encyclopedia of American Urban History, editor, 2007,  
Southern Histories: Public, Personal, and Sacred, 2003,  
Still Fighting the Civil War: The American South and Southern History, 2003 
The South for New Southerners, editor, 1991,  
Promised Land: The South Since 1945, 1987, 
Cotton Fields and Skyscrapers, 1982,

References

External links
David Goldfield: America Aflame: How the Civil War Created a Nation at Pritzker Military Museum & Library
Organization of American Historians: David Goldfield

Living people
American military historians
American male non-fiction writers
University System of Maryland alumni
Year of birth missing (living people)